Miss April (Swedish: Fröken April) is a 1958 Swedish comedy film directed by Göran Gentele and starring Gunnar Björnstrand, Lena Söderblom and Gaby Stenberg. It was shot at the Sundbyberg Studios in Stockholm. The film's sets were designed by the art directors Bertil Duroj and Arne Åkermark. It was entered into the 1959 Cannes Film Festival.

Synopsis
In Stockholm, Marcus a banker falls in love with the ballet dancer Maj who performs in the opera and gets himself a job working there. However, she is in love with the opera's star singer Osvald Berg and tries to get Marcus to help her gain his interest.

Cast
Gunnar Björnstrand as Marcus Arwidson
Lena Söderblom as Maj Bergman
Jarl Kulle as Osvald Berg
Gaby Stenberg as Vera Stenberg
Douglas Håge as Chorus master
Hjördis Petterson as Mrs. Berg
Meg Westergren as Anna
Lena Madsén as Siri
Olof Sandborg as Head of the Opera
Sif Ruud as Mrs. Nilsson
Birgitta Valberg as Ms. Holm, secretary
Per Oscarsson as Sverker Ek
Sven Holmberg as Malmnäs
Björn Gustafson as Director of the opera
Georg Skarstedt as Stage Manager
Bengt Eklund as Hink
Börje Mellvig as Prosecutor
Hans Strååt as Baecke
Tord Stål as Judge
Kurt Bendix as Opera Conductor
 Carl-Axel Hallgren as Policeman 
 Ivar Wahlgren as Theatre janitor

References

External links

1958 films
1950s Swedish-language films
1958 comedy films
Swedish comedy films
Films directed by Göran Gentele
1950s Swedish films